The year 1781 in architecture involved some significant architectural events and new buildings.

Buildings and structures

Buildings

Brizlee Tower, Alnwick, Northumberland, England, a folly erected for Hugh Percy, 1st Duke of Northumberland, possibly designed by Robert Adam
St. Hilarius Parish Church of Näfels, Switzerland, designed by architects Johann Singer and Jakob Singer.
Triumphal Arc, Kamianets-Podilskyi, Ukraine, built for the visit of Polish King Stanisław August Poniatowski to the city of Kamianets-Podilskyi.
Sturehov Manor near Stockholm, designed by Carl Fredrik Adelcrantz, probably completed.
Montagu House, Portman Square, London, designed by James Stuart, completed.

Awards
 Grand Prix de Rome, architecture: Louis Combes.

Births
March 13 – Karl Friedrich Schinkel, Prussian architect, city planner, and painter (died 1841)
August 12 – Robert Mills, possibly the first native-born American to train as a professional architect (died 1855)

Deaths
date unknown – Pietro Camporese the Elder, Italian architect (born 1726)

References

Architecture
Years in architecture
18th-century architecture